Ralph Barclay Young  (born 1945) is a Canadian real estate developer. He has served as the Chancellor of the University of Alberta since 2012. He is the former CEO of Melcor Developments. Young attended the University of Alberta, University of Saskatchewan, and Queen's University.

References

1945 births
Living people
Chancellors of the University of Alberta
People from Saskatoon